Lake Lila is a remote  lake in the William C. Whitney Wilderness Area, in the west-central portion of the Adirondack Park. It is accessed via a  dirt road. Boat access to the lake is by hand-launch only, after a  portage from the parking lot.

It is the twenty-second largest body of water in the park, and the largest lake in the Adirondack Park whose shoreline is entirely state-owned. Of the 100 largest lakes in the park, it is one of only five which are free of motorboats, jetskis, and floatplanes, including Lows, Little Tupper, Round, and Saint Regis Pond.

The southeastern portion of Lake Lila is an extensive wetland drained by the Shingle Shanty Brook, which feeds the lake; the lake is drained by the Beaver River. The lake is bordered by  Mount Frederica.

There are 24 primitive campsites, 18 of which are accessible only by boat.

Fish found within Lake Lila include smallmouth bass, lake trout, yellow perch, and brown bullhead. Landlocked salmon and brook trout are present in very small numbers.

History
Lake Lila was originally called Smith Lake. William Seward Webb assembled a  preserve, called Nehasane Park, in the process of creating the Mohawk and Malone Railway in 1892. Webb built a Great Camp, Forest Lodge, on the western shore of Smith Lake, which he renamed for his wife Lila (Eliza Osgood Vanderbilt Webb).

The railway station that formerly served the lodge still stands. The area was originally known as Lake Lila Primitive Area, before it was made a part of the William C. Whitney Wilderness Area in 1997. The railroad right-of-way is being renovated by owner New York State in 2021-2022, after a total lack of service since 1981, and the Adirondack Railroad will begin tourist passenger service from Utica through the former Webb lands in 2022, en route to a new northern terminus of Tupper Lake (108 miles).

References

Adirondack Great Camps
Adirondack Park
Lila
Protected areas of Hamilton County, New York
Lila